Joseph R. Redner (born 1940 in New Jersey) is the owner of the Mons Venus, a nude strip club in Tampa, Florida, and is known as the father of the nude lap dance.

Redner has been engaged in legal battles with the Tampa City Council, which has tried to place restrictions on the strip club industry for 25 years.  Mons Venus and Redner have filed suits that have reached the Supreme Court and have become case law in many court cases.  Redner ran for County Commissioner as an independent in 2006. During that run Redner had a chair thrown at him on the Bleepin Truth LIVE in a debate with a Republican pundit. The clip from the show was carried on 300 TV stations across the country, giving Redner a tremendous boost in name recognition in the process.  Redner's website, The Voice of Freedom, was initially created to inform citizens of his ongoing legal battles with the government, but later expanded to cover other First Amendment issues.  He is a host of a weekly, live call-in TV program entitled First Freedom TV on Tampa Bay Community Network (TBCN.org), a local Tampa Bay area Public, educational, and government access (PEG) cable TV channel.

In a federal lawsuit filed against Hillsborough County commissioners after they banned the county itself from recognizing gay pride displays, Redner included the statement that he is gay. In an earlier version of the same suit Redner, did not mention his sexual orientation and had previously never mentioned it publicly. His fight against the ordinance has pitted him against local politician Ronda Storms on many occasions.

Mons Venus and Redner won a large verdict in an eminent domain case when property was taken for a freeway.

On March 6, 2007, Redner garnered the number two spot in a six-person race for Tampa City Council, District 1, and faced the incumbent chairperson in a runoff March 27, 2007.  Joe Redner lost the election gaining 44% of the vote.

Redner has appeared on Live Prayer to debate his beliefs and defend his business.

Medical marijuana case 
In 2018, Redner made headlines again when he sued the Florida Department of Health for the right to grow his own marijuana. Redner is in remission from lung cancer, and his doctor recommended hemp juice as part of his treatment. Florida passed medical marijuana via a constitutional amendment in 2016, but juicing is not one the methods approved by that law, so Redner sued to be able to grow and juice his own. On April 17, 2018, the judge in the case lifted a stay which will allow Redner to begin growing marijuana while the case proceeds, a decision the Department of Health said it plans to appeal.

References

External links
 'Voice of Freedom'
Joe Redner for State Senate

1940 births
Living people
Businesspeople from Tampa, Florida
American LGBT businesspeople
American entertainment industry businesspeople
Strip club owners